The  was the standard fixed light machine gun on aircraft of the Imperial Japanese Navy during World War II. This weapon was not related to the Type 97 heavy tank machine gun used by the Imperial Japanese Army in armored vehicles, or the Type 97 automatic cannon used as an anti-tank rifle.

Design
The 'Navy Type 97 aircraft machine gun' was similar to the 'Army Type 89 machine gun', being a licensed copy of the Vickers Class E machine gun. It was highly suitable for synchronization and was used as the cowling armament on the A6M Zero. However, the Type 97 remained chambered for the British  cartridge and the Type 89 was chambered for a new  cartridge developed in Japan, making their ammunition non-interchangeable.

Deployment
The Type 97 came into service in 1937, and was used in the Nakajima B6N, Yokosuka K5Y, Yokosuka D4Y, Aichi D3A, Aichi E16A, Kawanishi E7K, Kawanishi N1K and its land-based derivative, the N1K-J, Mitsubishi J2M, Mitsubishi F1M2, in addition to the Mitsubishi A6M Zero and its floatplane derivative, the Nakajima A6M2-N. The Type 97 also has been used by the ground troops with modification by adding bipod and spade grip.

See also

Type 89 machine gun
Type 92 machine gun
Type 100 machine gun

References

Further reading

Light machine guns
Machine guns of Japan
Military equipment introduced in the 1930s